Siloam Springs City Park is a triangular city park in the center of Siloam Springs, Arkansas.  Established c. 1897, it is bounded on the north by West University Street, the east by South Mount Olive Street, and roughly on the west by Sager Creek.  The creek and two springs are the park's principal natural features; the springs are believed to be those that gave the city its name, and are now located in a sunken concrete basin with fieldstone walls.  The park also has a c. 1897 Queen Anne style gazebo and a footbridge across the creek just above a low stone dam.  The West University Street bridge, built in 1911, has distinctive handrails with embedded light fixtures.

The park was listed on the National Register of Historic Places in 1988.

See also
National Register of Historic Places listings in Benton County, Arkansas

References

Parks on the National Register of Historic Places in Arkansas
Queen Anne architecture in Arkansas
Buildings and structures completed in 1897
Buildings and structures in Siloam Springs, Arkansas
Parks in Arkansas
Siloam Springs, Arkansas
Protected areas of Benton County, Arkansas
National Register of Historic Places in Benton County, Arkansas
Historic district contributing properties in Arkansas